Master in the House (abbreviated as Jipsabu) is a South Korean television program that aired on SBS weekly on Sundays at 18:25 (KST) from December 31, 2017 until the conclusion of Season 1 on September 18, 2022 when the show went on hiatus. Season 2 began from January 1, 2023, on Sundays at 17:00 (KST).

Overview
The cast members spend two days and one night together with reputable figures of various fields or professions, known as Masters, and get to know about the lives of the Masters, in the hopes of gaining knowledge and wisdom. There are also 1-day Masters in the show, which the cast would instead spend a day together with.

Cast

Cast members

1-day Disciples

Changes to the cast
On December 29, 2019, it was announced that Shin Sung-rok would join the show as part of the fixed cast, beginning from the episode aired January 12, 2020. This marked Shin's first fixed variety show of his career.

Original cast members Lee Sang-yoon and Yook Sung-jae left the show on February 11, 2020 during episode 111 and were replaced by Kim Dong-hyun and Cha Eun-woo beginning on episode 114. Both Shin and Cha departed the show on June 20, 2021, with episode 177 being their last as regular cast members.

Yoo Su-bin then joined as a fixed cast member on episode 180, followed by Eun Ji-won from episode 216. Yoo left the show on April 10, 2022, with episode 215 being his last.

It was announced on June 24, 2022 that NCT member Doyoung has joined the show as a fixed cast member, with his first episode airing on July 3, 2022.

On December 21, 2022, it was confirmed that retired baseball player Lee Dae-ho and Got7 member BamBam would join the show as fixed cast members, while original member Lee Seung-gi would not be joining for Season 2.

Episodes (2017–2018)

Episodes (2019)

Episodes (2020)

Episodes (2021)

Episodes (2022)

Episodes (2023)

Ratings
 The table below show the highest rating received in red, and the lowest rating in blue each year.
 NR denotes that the show did not rank in the top 20 daily programs on that date.

2017-2018

2019

2020

2021

2022

2023

International versions

Malaysia
In January 2022, Malaysia was the first country in Asia that picked up to release its own version of Master in the House, known as Master in the House Malaysia (MITHM), which was jointly produced by Primeworks Studios and SBS. A press conference was held at Petaling Jaya Performing Arts Centre in One Utama Shopping Centre, Petaling Jaya, featuring five Malaysian Masters: Siti Nurhaliza, Yusof Haslam, Rashid Sidek, Sherson Lian, and WAU Animation founder Usamah Zaid. Five celebrities were chosen as fixed cast members: Hael Husaini, Andi Bernadee, Meyrasam (Cassia), Scha Elinnea and Sharifah Rose. The show will have 10 episodes, and would be broadcast weekly on TV3 starting January 15, 2022, on every Saturday night at 22:00 (MST).

Awards and nominations

Notes

References

External links

South Korean reality television series
2018 South Korean television series debuts
Seoul Broadcasting System original programming
Korean-language television shows
South Korean variety television shows